Peter Füri (9 October 1937 – 11 May 2015) was a Swiss football player and manager, who played during the 1950s and 1960s. He died on 11 May 2015 at his home in Muttenz due to heart failure. 

Füri was born and brought up in Kleinbasel a quarter of Basel on the right hand side of the Rhine. He started his football at the small local club FC St. Clara and later joined the youth teams of FC Basel. During his active career Füri first played as a striker for FC Concordia Basel and later as a defender for FC La Chaux-de-Fonds and FC Basel. 

Füri joined Basel's first team for their 1961–62 season under trainer Jiří Sobotka. He played his domestic league debut for his new club in the away game on 5 November 1961 as Basel were beaten 0–1 by Young Fellows Zürich. He scored his first goal for his club on 11 March 1962 in the away game on 11 March 1962 as Basel drew 2–2 against Lugano. 

In 1963 he was member of the Basel squad who won the Swiss Cup by beating the favourites Grasshopper Club Zürich in the Final at the Wankdorf Stadium by 2–0. Basel trainer at that time was Georges Sobotka and team mates were Swiss international goalkeeper Kurt Stettler, team captain Bruno Michaud and Odermatt. Füri played in all cup games except the Final because he became ill.

A well-documented curiosity was the fact that during the winter break of their 1963–64 season the team travelled on a world tour. This saw them visit British Hong Kong, Malaysia, Singapore, Australia, New Zealand, French Polynesia, Mexico and the United States. First team manager Jiří Sobotka together with 16 players and 15 members of staff, supporters and journalists participated in this world tour from 10 January to 10 February 1964. Team captain Bruno Michaud filmed the events with his super-8 camara. The voyage around the world included 19 flights and numerous bus and train journeys. Club chairman, Lucien Schmidlin, led the group, but as they arrived in the hotel in Bangkok, he realised that 250,000 Swiss Francs were missing. The suitcase that he had filled with the various currencies was not with them. He had left it at home, but fortunately Swiss Air were able to deliver this to him within just a few days. During the tour a total of ten friendly/test games were played, these are listed in their 1963–64 season. Five wins, three draws, two defeats, but also three major injuries resulted from these test matches. An eye injury for Walter Baumann, a knee injury for Bruno Michaud and a broken leg for Peter Füri himself, soon reduced the number of players to just 13.

Between the years 1961 and 1966 Füri played a total of 127 games for Basel scoring a total of three goals. 71 of these games were in the Nationalliga A, 14 in the Swiss Cup, ten in the european competitions (Cup of the Alps, European Cup Winners' Cup, UEFA Intertoto Cup) and 32 were friendly games. He scored two goals in the domestic league and the other was scored during the test games.

Füri ended his football career as player-manager with SC Binningen between 1966 and 68. Füri was a qualified electrician and worked up until his retirement as head of department in the distribution center for Coop in Pratteln.

Honours and Titles
Concordia Basel
 Swiss 1. Liga champions and promoted: 1957
Basel
 Swiss Cup winner: 1963

Sources and References

1937 births
2015 deaths
Swiss men's footballers
Swiss football managers
SC Binningen players
FC Concordia Basel players
FC La Chaux-de-Fonds players
FC Basel players
Association football forwards
Association football defenders
Footballers from Basel